Saddleback Valley Unified School District (SVUSD) is a public school district in South Orange County, California. It includes 23 elementary schools, four intermediate schools, four comprehensive high schools, and four alternative schools. It serves all of Lake Forest, Laguna Hills, Laguna Woods and serves parts of Mission Viejo, Aliso Viejo, Rancho Santa Margarita, and a very small portion of Irvine. Most of Trabuco, Modjeska, and Dove Canyon is in the school district, and communities such as Foothill Ranch and Portola Hills are also served by the district.

Schools

High schools
El Toro High School
Laguna Hills High School
Mission Viejo High School
Silverado High School
Trabuco Hills High School

Intermediate schools
La Paz Intermediate School
Los Alisos Intermediate School
Rancho Santa Margarita Intermediate School
Serrano Intermediate School

Elementary schools

Cielo Vista Elementary School
Cordillera Elementary School (Closed)
de Portola Elementary School
Del Cerro Elementary School
Del Lago Elementary School
Foothill Ranch Elementary School
Gates Dual Language Immersion Elementary School
Glen Yermo Elementary School

Lake Forest Elementary School
La Madera Elementary School (GATE)
La Tierra Early Education Center
Linda Vista Magnet Elementary School (IB World School)
Lomarena Elementary School
Melinda Heights Elementary School
Montevideo Elementary School
Olivewood Elementary School

Portola Hills Elementary School
Rancho Cañada Elementary School
Robinson Elementary School
San Joaquin Elementary School
Santiago STEAM Magnet Elementary School
Trabuco Elementary School
Trabuco Mesa Elementary School (GATE)
Valencia Elementary School

Alternative Schools 

 Esperanza Education Center
High School Credit Recovery
 Silverado High School

Saddleback Virtual Academy 
The SVUSD Virtual Academy serves students at the Elementary, Intermediate, and High School levels.

Sex abuse allegations
On March 23, 2022, two former Mission Viejo High School students filed a civil suit in Orange County Superior Court alleging that James Harris, husband of SVUSD visual and performing arts coordinator Kathy Cannarozzi Harris as well as a substitute teacher at the school, groomed them and sexually abused them in the late 1990s. One of the plaintiffs was 15 at the time. The women allege that Kathy Harris personally observed the abuse, which allegedly occurred on the Mission Viejo High School campus and at her home. According to the filing, they reported the abuse to the SVUSD several times over the course of two decades, but no decisive action was taken. Jim Harris denied the allegations to the Los Angeles Times. The SVUSD said it was investigating. Kathy Harris still teaches at the school.

References

External links 
 

School districts in Orange County, California
Mission Viejo, California